Erik McCree (born December 20, 1993) is an American professional basketball player who last played for the Magnolia Hotshots of the Philippine Basketball Association (PBA). He played college basketball for Murray State and Louisiana Tech.

College career
McCree had previously been a part of Murray State University under his freshman year of college before transferring to Louisiana Tech University in 2013. In his junior year of college, he made it to the All-Conference USA Second Team, while he would improve to the All-Conference USA First Team in his senior year.

Professional career

Sioux Falls Skyforce (2017)
After finishing his last four years of college from 2014–2017, he would end up being undrafted in the 2017 NBA draft. McCree would end up being a part of the Houston Rockets's Summer League squad for the 2017 NBA Summer League, eventually signing with the Miami Heat for their training camp squad. He would ultimately be waived from the Heat before the regular season began but would be assigned to the Sioux Falls Skyforce afterward. He would continue playing for them until December 21, 2017, one day after his 24th birthday.

Utah Jazz (2017–2018)
On December 21, 2017, McGree signed a two-way contract with the Utah Jazz, replacing Eric Griffin's spot on the team. Throughout the rest of the season, McCree would end up splitting his playing time between the Jazz and their NBA G League affiliate, the Salt Lake City Stars. McCree would make his official NBA debut on February 5, 2018, playing at around 2 minutes in a 133–109 blowout win over the New Orleans Pelicans.

VL Pesaro (2018–2019)
On August 1, 2018, McCree signed a deal with the Italian club VL Pesaro.

BCM Gravelines-Dunkerque (2019–2020)
On July 26, 2019, he has signed with BCM Gravelines-Dunkerque of the French LNB Pro A.

Bakkan Bears (2020)
On October 6, 2020, he signed with Bakken Bears of Basketligaen.

BCM Gravelines-Dunkerque (2020–2021)
On October 28, 2020, McCree returned to BCM Gravelines-Dunkerque after playing in two games with the Bakken Bears, signing with the team for the rest of the 2020–2021 season. He averaged 13.8 points, 6.7 rebounds, 3.4 assists and 1.0 steal per game.

Peristeri (2021–2022)
On July 28, 2021, McCree signed with Peristeri of the Greek Basket League and the Basketball Champions League. He averaged 10.2 points, 4.5 rebounds, and 1.3 assists per game.

Gaziantep Basketbol (2022)
On January 14, 2022, McCree signed with Gaziantep Basketbol of the Basketbol Süper Ligi.

On June 17, 2022, McCree signed with Shiga Lakestars of the B.League. However, he never played for the team.

Magnolia Hotshots (2023)
In December 2022, he signed with the Magnolia Hotshots of the Philippine Basketball Association (PBA) as the team's import for the 2023 PBA Governors' Cup. After playing three games, he was replaced by Antonio Hester.

NBA career statistics

Regular season

|-
| style="text-align:left;"| 
| style="text-align:left;"| Utah
|| 4 || 0 || 2.0 || .000 || .000 || – || .3 || .0 || .3 || .0 || .0
|- class="sortbottom"
| style="text-align:center;" colspan="2"| Career
|| 4 || 0 || 2.0 || .000 || .000 || – || .3 || .0 || .3 || .0 || .0

References

External links
Murray State Racers bio
Louisiana Tech Bulldogs bio

1993 births
Living people
21st-century African-American sportspeople
African-American basketball players
American expatriate basketball people in Denmark
American expatriate basketball people in France
American expatriate basketball people in Greece
American expatriate basketball people in Italy
American expatriate basketball people in the Philippines
American expatriate basketball people in Turkey
American men's basketball players
Bakken Bears players
Basketball players from Orlando, Florida
BCM Gravelines players
Gaziantep Basketbol players
Lega Basket Serie A players
Louisiana Tech Bulldogs basketball players
Magnolia Hotshots players
Murray State Racers men's basketball players
Peristeri B.C. players
Philippine Basketball Association imports
Power forwards (basketball)
Salt Lake City Stars players
Sioux Falls Skyforce players
Undrafted National Basketball Association players
Utah Jazz players
Victoria Libertas Pallacanestro players